In four spacetime dimensions, N = 8 supergravity is the most symmetric quantum field theory which involves gravity and a finite number of fields. It can be found from a dimensional reduction of 11D supergravity by making the size of seven of the dimensions go to zero. It has eight supersymmetries, which is the most any gravitational theory can have, since there are eight half-steps between spin 2 and spin −2. (The spin 2 graviton is the particle with the highest spin in this theory.) More supersymmetries would mean the particles would have superpartners with spins higher than 2. The only theories with spins higher than 2 which are consistent involve an infinite number of particles (such as String Theory and Higher-Spin Theories). Stephen Hawking in his Brief History of Time speculated that this theory could be the Theory of Everything. However, in later years this was abandoned in favour of string theory. There has been renewed interest in the 21st century, with the possibility that this theory may be finite.

Calculations
It has been found recently that the expansion of N = 8 supergravity in terms of Feynman diagrams has shown that N = 8 supergravity is in some ways  a product of two N = 4 super Yang–Mills theories. This is written schematically as:

 N = 8 supergravity = (N = 4 super Yang–Mills) × (N = 4 super Yang–Mills)

This is not surprising, as N = 8 supergravity contains six independent representations of N = 4 super Yang–Mills.

Particle content
The theory contains 1 graviton (spin 2), 8 gravitinos (spin 3/2), 28 vector bosons (spin 1), 56 fermions (spin 1/2), 70 scalar fields (spin 0) where we don't distinguish particles with negative spin. These numbers are simple combinatorial numbers that come from Pascal's Triangle and also the number of ways of writing n as a sum of 8 nonnegative cubes A173681.

One reason why the theory was abandoned was that the 28 vector bosons which form an O(8) gauge group is too small to contain the standard model U(1) x SU(2) x SU(3) gauge group, which can only fit within the orthogonal group O(10).

For model building, it has been assumed that almost all the supersymmetries would be broken in nature, leaving just one supersymmetry (N = 1), although nowadays because of the lack of evidence for N = 1 supersymmetry higher supersymmetries are now being considered such as N = 2.

Connection with superstring theory
N = 8 supergravity can be viewed as the low-energy approximation of the type IIA or type IIB superstring with 6 of its dimensions compactified on a 6-torus. Equivalently, it may also be viewed as 11D M-theory with seven of its dimensions compactified on a 7-torus.

Global symmetries
Some surprising global symmetries have been found in this theory. For example, it has been shown that there is an E7 global symmetry but in order for the theory to be finite it is thought that there may be other symmetries not yet found.

References

Supersymmetric quantum field theory
Theories of gravity